Sydney Clouts (1926–1982) was a South African poet. He was born in Cape Town, South Africa, and emigrated to London in the early 1960s. His book One Life gained its own volume in the New Coin Poetry Magazine in 1966. This debut poetry collection One Life won him the Ingrid Jonker Prize in 1966, for the best debut of Afrikaans or English poetry. It also won him the Olive Schreiner Prize for new and emergent talent of English Literature.

Biography 
Sydney Clouts was born in Cape Town, South Africa in 1926. As a young boy, Sydney wrote short stories about adventures, as well as poems. He served in the military and World War II. After serving, he later worked as an editor and manager for the International Press Agency. Sydney attended the University of Cape Town, where he earned a BA in 1950. He also attended the South African College Schools. In the early 1960s, Clouts emigrated to the United Kingdom. In August 1982, Sydney Clouts died.

Works 
Sydney Clouts is described as a metaphysical poet by Kevin Goddard. Goddard explains that Clouts' writing style illustrates relations to elements of human experience. His poems were being published in magazines like Jewish Affairs, Standpunte, Contrast, and New Coin and he started gaining popularity. His beginning poems were published in his former school, South African College's, magazine. His debut book, One Life (1966) was a collection of poems. In late 1966, Clouts' volume appeared in the New Coin Poetry Magazine. According to Guy Butler, this confirmed his reputation and gained new readers for Clouts. His other works include Sydney Clouts: Collected Poems (1984), which was a collection of his poems put together by his wife and brother that was published posthumously. It was published by David Philip of Cape Town. After One Life won both the Olive Schreiner Prize and the Ingrid Jonker Prize, Clouts didn't publish anymore books.

Bibliography 

One Life (1966)
 Sydney Clouts: Collected Poems (1984)

Awards 
In 1966, Sydney Clouts was awarded the Ingrid Jonker Prize, for the best debut of Afrikaans or English poetry, for his book One Life. He was also awarded the Olive Schreiner Prize for English Literature.

References 

1926 births
1982 deaths
20th-century South African poets
University of Cape Town alumni
Writers from Cape Town
South African military personnel of World War II